7 South African Infantry Battalion is a motorised infantry unit of the South African Army.

History

Origin
1973: 7 SAI was established on 1 October, at Bourke's Luck, Eastern Transvaal (Mpumalanga) by Commandant Eddie Webb. 
1974:The first national servicemen began training in 1974.

1980: 7 SAI is relocated to Phalaborwa.

Angola Bush War Deployment
1983: The July intake's training phase was shortened to accommodate a need to deploy a company for Operation Askari and Sector 10. This company would deploy with 101 Battalion in a reaction force role.

1984: a Company was stationed at Rundu for reaction force duties under the command of 202 Battalion for 6 months, whereafter they were posted to Nepara for a further 6-month deployment. After a period of leave they were posted back to Nepara for a third time, spending their 40 celebration on the 17/30 cutline in a fox camp (BF). Members of this company eventually joined the 905/6 reaction force duties. Bravo company was also involved in operations to capture SWAPO radio operators using two modified Ratel's fitted with radio direction-finding equipment named Pointer and Spotter.

1987: August intake of 7 SAI's Alpha Company, was deployed to the operational area of Cuito Cuanavale, Angola in 1988 under the command of a Captain G.P. Butler.  Alpha Company consisted of five infantry platoons as well as an  mortar platoon and was deployed to the eastern side of the Cuito river (a tributary of the Okavango River) for a period of 1 month.  During its time of deployment, various platoons were allocated as mechanised infantry (in Ratels) while the remainder formed a base camp sending out roving patrols in the area.

After a month of deployment in Angola, the peace accords were signed and Alpha Company returned to a base camp in Rundu, South West Africa.

South West Africa / Namibia
1989: during the UNTAG deployment in South West Africa/Namibia, Alpha Company provided base defence for the town of Oshakati with some of its platoons participating in the various counter insurgency operations against the PLAN infiltration that occurred during this time.

Post Apartheid
7 SAI changed from a training unit to a rear area protection unit when 113 Battalion became part of the unit. 

1994: 7 SAI became part of the Rapid Deployment Force during November.

Lesotho intervention
1998: 7 SAI took part in Operation Boleas in Lesotho to restore order after an army coup.

Burundi
2002: 7 SAI took part in the UN/AU peace mission, Operation Fibre to restore stability in Burundi.

Under the Infantry Formation
2002: 7 SAI was placed under the command of the South African Army Infantry Formation as a motorised infantry unit.

The SANDF's Motorised Infantry is transported mostly by Samil trucks, Mamba APC's or other un-protected motor vehicles. Samil 20, 50 and 100 trucks transport soldiers, towing guns, and carrying equipment and supplies. Samil trucks are all-wheel drive, in order to have vehicles that function reliably in extremes of weather and terrain. Motorised infantry have an advantage in mobility allowing them to move to critical sectors of the battlefield faster, allowing better response to enemy movements, as well as the ability to outmaneuver the enemy.

Insignia 
The unit's emblem is a rooikat superimposed on a Maltese cross, which is in memory of two gold crosses commissioned by the ZAR President TF Burgers and presented to two Bourkes Luck ladies for their help in caring for and nursing wounded Boer commandos during the Sekhukhune War.

Previous dress insignia

Current dress insignia

Leadership

Notes

References 

Infantry battalions of South Africa
Infantry regiments of South Africa
Military units and formations established in 1973